Green Island or Greene Island can refer to:

Places

Africa
 Green Island (Egypt), in the Gulf of Suez
 Green Island (Eritrea), in the Red Sea (Gulf of Zula)

Antarctica
 Green Island (Berthelot Islands)

Asia
 Green Island, Hong Kong
 Green Island, Taiwan
 Green Island (Kerala), India
 Green Island (Kuwait)
 Qingdao, China
 Ilha Verde, Macau

Europe

United Kingdom and Ireland
 Green Island, Scotland, Enard Bay, Scotland
 Green Island (Dorset), Poole Harbour, Dorset
 , Isles of Scillies
 Green Island, Jersey, Jersey, Channel Islands
 Greenisland, County Antrim, Northern Ireland
 Green Island, County Down, a townland in County Down, Northern Ireland

North America
 Greenland

Canada
 Green Island (Catalina), Newfoundland and Labrador
 Green Island (Fortune), Newfoundland and Labrador
 Green Island (Rideau River), Ontario
 Green Island (Severn Sound), in Lake Muskoka, Ontario
 Green Island (Ottawa River), in Ontario
 Greene Island (Lake Ontario), in Ontario
 Greene Island (Lake Huron), in Ontario
 Green Island, one of the Tusket Islands in Nova Scotia

Caribbean
 Green Island (Antigua and Barbuda), off the east coast of Antigua
 Green Island, Jamaica
 Green Island, Saba, an islet off the north coast of Saba, Netherlands

United States
 Green Island, Uganik Bay, Alaska
 Green Island, Aleutian Islands, Alaska
 Green Island (California), in the Napa River near San Pablo Bay
 Green Island, Chugach National Forest, Alaska
 Green Island, Hawaii, part of Kure Atoll
 Green Island (Massachusetts), in Boston Outer Harbor, Massachusetts
 Green Island (Michigan), in Lake Michigan
 Green Island, New York, a village
 Green Island Bridge, New York
 Green Island, Iowa
 Green Island (Conchas Lake), in Conchas Lake, New Mexico
 Green Island (Ohio), Lake Erie
 Green Island (Wisconsin), Green Bay, Wisconsin
 Greene Island (Rhode Island), Rhode Island

Oceania

Australia
 Green Island (Queensland)
 Green Island National Park, Queensland
 Green Island (New South Wales)
 Green Island (Tasmania)
 Green Island (Western Australia), in Oyster Harbour, King George Sound

New Zealand
 Green Island (Okaihe), Dunedin
 Green Island, New Zealand, a suburb of Dunedin
 Green Island (Foveaux Strait), a small island off the coast of Ruapuke Island

Papua New Guinea
 Green Islands (Papua New Guinea)
 Green Island, Papua New Guinea, alternate name for Nissan Island, the largest of the Green Islands

Other
 "Green Island" (also known as The Island), a song by Ewan MacColl on his album Naming of Names
 Green Island Cement, a Hong Kong company
 Green Island FC, a football club in Green Island, New Zealand

See also  
 
 
 Big Green Island, Tasmania
 Buller, Whittell and Green Islands Nature Reserve, a protected area of Western Australia
 List of islands called Green Holm
 Greenly Island (disambiguation), a number of different islands
 Gruney (disambiguation)
 Île Verte (disambiguation), French for "Green Island"
 Verde Island, Portuguese for "Green Island"
 Ilha Verde, formerly Verde or Green Island, now a neighborhood of Macao